Tiger Woods PGA Tour 2004 is a sports video game developed by EA Redwood Shores for the GameCube, PlayStation 2 and Xbox versions, Headgate Studios for the Microsoft Windows version, and Backbone Emeryville for the Game Boy Advance and N-Gage versions, and published by EA Sports for GameCube, Microsoft Windows, PlayStation 2, Xbox, Game Boy Advance and N-Gage.

Reception 

Tiger Woods PGA Tour 2004 received "generally positive" reviews, according to review aggregator Metacritic. GameSpot named it the best PlayStation 2 game of September 2003.

Edge gave the GameCube, PS2, Xbox and PC versions a score of eight out of ten and stated: "This relaxed, arcade-like approach makes for something that's not so much about simulation, but more emulation; letting you thwack the ball with all the verve of an expert, without the worry of any homework. Fun, then, and lots of it."

The game's PlayStation 2 version received a "Platinum" sales award from the Entertainment and Leisure Software Publishers Association (ELSPA), indicating sales of at least 300,000 copies in the United Kingdom. By July 2006, the PlayStation 2 version had sold 1 million copies and earned $43 million in the United States alone. Next Generation ranked it as the 51st highest-selling game launched for the PlayStation 2, Xbox or GameCube between January 2000 and July 2006 in that country. Combined sales of Tiger Woods PGA Tour games released in the 2000s reached 5 million units in the United States by July 2006.

References

External links 
 

2003 video games
EA Sports games
Game Boy Advance games
GameCube games
Games with GameCube-GBA connectivity
Golf video games
Tiger Woods video games
N-Gage games
PlayStation 2 games
Video games developed in the United States
Video games scored by Burke Trieschmann
Video games scored by Jeff van Dyck
Video games set in Antarctica
Video games set in Arizona
Video games set in Australia
Video games set in California
Video games set in England
Video games set in Florida
Video games set in Hawaii
Video games set in Japan
Video games set in New York (state)
Video games set in North Carolina
Video games set in Peru
Video games set in Scotland
Video games set in Washington (state)
Windows games
Xbox games
Multiplayer and single-player video games